There were two special elections to the United States House of Representatives during 2003.

His predecessor, Patsy Mink (D) had died September 28, 2002 and was posthumously re-elected in November. Case was elected in a November 30, 2002 special election to finish the term that ended January 3, 2003. Case was then re-elected on January 4, 2003 to the new term.
His predecessor, Larry Combest (R) had resigned May 31, 2003 after deaths in his family.

See also 
 Hawaii's 2nd congressional district special elections, 2002-2003
 Texas's 19th congressional district special election, 2003
 List of special elections to the United States Senate
 List of special elections to the United States House of Representatives